A Skeletal Domain is the thirteenth studio album by American death metal band Cannibal Corpse. Released on September 16, 2014 by Metal Blade Records, the album was produced at Audiohammer Studios by Mark Lewis.

The album entered the US Billboard 200 at number 32, making it Cannibal Corpse's highest charting album on the Billboard 200 to date. 8,825 copies were sold in its first week.

Background 
Bassist Alex Webster said "I think it's turning out to be kind of a dark-sounding album. Which, you know, it's a death metal album, so, of course, it should be kind of dark and eerie sounding anyway, but I think this one a little more than normal. That was kind of the direction the songwriting went in."

About the direction of the material he also stated "I think our fans appreciate our consistency. That said, I think we have some material on this album that sounds a bit different from what we've done before."

Release and promotion 
"Sadistic Embodiment" was officially released on the YouTube channel of Metal Blade Records on July 1, 2014. "The Murderer's Pact" was streamed via Loudwire.com on September 8, 2014.

A music video for the song "Kill or Become" was released on September 24, 2014.

Track listing 

"Icepick Lobotomy" is labelled as "Ice-Pick Lobotomy" in the album's liner notes.

Credits 
Writing, performance and production credits are adapted from the album liner notes.

Personnel

Cannibal Corpse 
 George "Corpsegrinder" Fisher – vocals
 Pat O'Brien – lead guitar
 Rob Barrett – rhythm guitar
 Alex Webster – bass
 Paul Mazurkiewicz – drums

Production 
 Mark Lewis – recording, production, engineering, mixing

Visual art 
 Vince Locke – cover art  
 Brian Ames – layout
 Alex Morgan – photography

Charts

References

External links 
 
 A Skeletal Domain at Metal Blade Records

2014 albums
Cannibal Corpse albums
Metal Blade Records albums
Albums produced by Mark Lewis (music producer)